The 1994 BPR International GT Endurance Series was the inaugural season of BPR Global GT Series.  It was a series for Grand Touring style cars broken into four classes based on power and manufacturer involvement, using the names GT1 through GT4.  It began on 6 March 1994 and ended 13 November 1994 after 8 races, although no championships were held over the course of the season, each race was an independent event.

Schedule

Entries

GT1

GT3

Season results

References

External links
 1994 BPR Global GT Series season

BPR Global GT Series
BPR Global GT